10% Dis is a single from MC Lyte's album Lyte as a Rock produced by the hip hop duo Audio Two, who are also credited as songwriters.

The song was a diss track to then-Hurby Azor associate Antoinette, who she accuses of having "stole the beat" to the Audio Two hit Top Billin'.

It is frequently mentioned among the best rap's diss track, both from the 80s and in general, and has been sampled/referenced by various artists, such as A Tribe Called Quest, Tupac Shakur with Outlawz, Ras Kass, Bone Thugs-n-Harmony, Snoop Dogg, Lil' Kim, Foxy Brown, Common and Remy Ma.

In April 2013, the song was included  21 on Complex's "The 50 Best Rap Songs by Women" list.

Conception and composition 
During an interview with Vibe in 2011, Lyte stated that the feud started from a deal between a deal that was made between Hurby Luv Bug (Salt-N-Pepa's producer) and the rap duo Audio Two to record and release a song called 'Stop Illin' based on their hit song Top Billin'.

According to Lyte, they told her to write a diss track to Antoinette, as doing so would make them look like "the wackest men on the face of the planet." The song, recorded at the I.N.S. Studios in New York City, became a single from her debut album Lyte as a Rock.

"It was pretty easy—we just sat there and thought of the worst things we could possibly say about somebody," Lyte recalled in 2007 in Brian Coleman's book Check The Technique. "It's titled that because that's only ten percent of what I could have said. I didn't even know Antoinette. It was strictly a war on wax."

Samples 
The song contains samples of Roxanne Shante's "Roxanne's Revenge" in your intro  and drum break in the background comes from The Honey Drippers's Impeach the President, James Brown's Super Bad and Audio Two's Top Billin'.

Appearances
"10% Dis" was included in his compilation albums The Very Best of MC Lyte (2001), The Shit I Never Dropped (2003), and  Cold Rock a Party - Best Of MC Lyte (2019).

Samples
MC Lyte herself has sampled the song on her other Diss Track to Antoinette "Shut the Eff Up! (Hoe)" and in his collaboration with Billy Lawrence on "Come On". It has also been sampled/referenced by several other artists:

In 1991, was interpolated in A Tribe Called Quest's song "The Infamous Date Rape" from the album The Low End Theory. In the third verse, Q-Tip sings "Baby, baby, baby I don't wanna be rude/But I know because of your bloody attitude" in reference to the line of the song in which it says "30 days a month your mood is rude/We know the cause of your bloody attitude".
In June 1996, 10% Dis was interpolated in Tupac Shakur and Outlawz's diss song Hit 'Em Up, which insults to several East Coast rappers, chief among them, Biggie Smalls. In the fifth verse, E.D.I. Mean sings the chorus "Beat biter, dope style taker/Tell you to your face you ain't nothing but a faker" changing it to "You's a beat biter, a Pac style taker/I'll tell you to your face, you ain't shit but a faker". Also Tupac Shakur has a sample of the song in "Crooked Nigga Too".
In November 1996 it was sampled by Ras Kass on the song "On Earth as It Is..." from his debut album Soul on Ice.
In 1997, was interpolated in Bone Thugs-n-Harmony's song "U Ain't Bone" from the album The Art of War. At the beginning of the second verse, Layzie Bone sings the chorus "Beat biter, dope style taker/Tell you to your face you ain't nothing but a faker" changing it to "They beat biters, dope-style takers/When I see you face-to-face/My nigga, I'm a treat you like a hater".
Snoop Dogg interpolates 10% Dis in his collaboration with N.W.A in Chin Check (1999). In the fourth verse he refers to the song saying "God damn hoes, here we go again"
In 1999, is interpolated on Mobb Deep's remix of Quiet Storm with Lil Kim, who used her guest verse to diss rapper Foxy Brown. She would reply in his collaboration with Capone-N-Noreaga in "Bang, Bang" (2000), which would also have an interpolation to 10% Dis. In the third verse he quotes the intro of the song singing "Hot damn ho, here we go again/Pop shit like a cock, +Lyte+ weight as your +Rocks+, bitch."
Another diss track by Foxy Brown, this time against Queen Latifah and Queen Pen, would be titled "10% Dis" in reference to the song.
In 2009, was sampled by Asher Roth on his hit song I Love College.
In 2016, the song is sampled on Common and Stevie Wonder's song "Black America Again".
In 2018, 10% Dis is interpolated for Remy Ma and Chris Brown's single Melanin Magic.

Legacy and influence

Critical reception 
Complex's Rob Kenner would write about the song "MC Lyte's "10% Dis" was 100% effective (...) As the step-sister of Brooklyn's own Giz and Milk from Audio Two, Lyte had access to the hottest beats, and she was also exempt from any sort of pressure to sleep her way to the top, demanding and receiving maximum respect from all men she encountered in this testosterone-soaked industry." Later they would comment in the same media "(...)The track featured a multitude of now-classic lines such as "hot damn hoe, here we go again" and "you're a beat biter, a dope style taker." Ironically, the beat for "10% Dis" sounded more like "Top Billin" than "I Got an Attitude" did." For his part, Rob Marriott would comment on the song "10% Dis is pure, unrelenting devastation - Ether before Ether."

On the 30th anniversary of its release, Albumism's Jesse Ducker reviewed "Lyte as a Rock," in which he commented on the song:

In December 2018, Eminem included the song in the list of his favorite diss tracks.

Accolades

Single track listing

7" Vinyl

A-Side (Rough Side)
 "10% Dis"	(5:00)

B-Side (Tough Side)
 "Kickin' 4 Brooklyn"	(2:21)

12" Vinyl

A-Side (Rough Side)
 "10% Dis" (Radio Version) (5:00)
 "10% Dis" (Acapella) (4:30)

B-Side (Tough Side)
 "10% Dis" (Original) (5:00)
 "Kickin' 4 Brooklyn" (2:21)

Personnel
Credits are taken from the liner notes.
Written-By – MC Lyte,  Gizmo (A1 to B1), Milk Dee 
Producer – Audio Two
Executive-Producer – Nat Robinson

References

1988 singles
MC Lyte songs
Atlantic Records singles
Diss tracks
1988 songs
Songs written by MC Lyte